Ilirjan Suli (born 11 October 1975), also known as Ilirian Suli, is an Albanian weightlifter. He competed for Albania at the 1996 Summer Olympics men's 76 kg event and at the 2000 Summer Olympics in the men's 77 kg event.

Suli won bronze medal at the 2000 European Weightlifting Championships in the 77 kg event

References

External links
 
 
 
 
 
 

1975 births
Living people
Albanian male weightlifters
Olympic weightlifters of Albania
Weightlifters at the 1996 Summer Olympics
Weightlifters at the 2000 Summer Olympics
Mediterranean Games silver medalists for Albania
Mediterranean Games medalists in weightlifting
Competitors at the 2005 Mediterranean Games
World Weightlifting Championships medalists
20th-century Albanian people
21st-century Albanian people